Soo Jung Ann (born 15 September 1987) is a South Korean pianist from Seoul. Ann was born to a musical family and started playing the piano at the age of six.

Ann received her bachelor's degree from the Korean National University of Arts in Seoul. She completed John O'Conor's postgraduate course at the Royal Irish Academy of Music and is pursuing a doctoral degree there, while also studying under Pavel Gililov at the Mozarteum University of Salzburg.

Ann has won several awards in international competitions. She received seventh place in the International Piano Competition in Hamamatsu and third prize in the AXA Dublin International Piano Competition in 2009. Ann attended the 15th, 16th, and 17th International Chopin Piano Competitions in 2005, 2010, and 2015, respectively, and attained the second stage in 2005 and 2015. Norwegian pianist  in a comment on Ann's performance of Beethovens 4th Piano Concerto in the finale in Bonn, praised her "tenderness, power and big virtuosity".

Ann has appeared as a soloist with orchestras in Asia as well as in Ireland and Poland. She has also performed at the Aspen Music Festival and School in the United States.

Prizes and awards 
 International Piano Competition in Hamamatsu, 6th prize
 AXA Dublin International Piano Competition, third prize
 2011 Hong Kong International Piano Competition, fourth prize
 58th International Music Competition Maria Canals of Barcelona, 2012, first prize
 2013 , first prize

References

External links 
 

Living people
1987 births
Korea National University of Arts alumni
South Korean musicians
South Korean pianists
South Korean women pianists
21st-century pianists
21st-century women pianists